Mytilostoma is a genus of fungi in the class Dothideomycetes. The relationship of this taxon to other taxa within the class is unknown (incertae sedis).

Species

Mytilostoma curtum
Mytilostoma deflectens
Mytilostoma gregarium
Mytilostoma hygrophilum
Mytilostoma nobile
Mytilostoma pachysporum
Mytilostoma subcompressum

See also
 List of Dothideomycetes genera incertae sedis

References

Dothideomycetes enigmatic taxa
Dothideomycetes genera